Corymbia clavigera, commonly known as apple gum or cabbage gum, is a species of tree that is endemic to a small area in the north-west Kimberley region of Western Australia. It has smooth, pale grey and white bark, lance-shaped or elliptical adult leaves, flower buds in groups of three or seven, white flowers and urn-shaped to barrel-shaped fruit.

Description
It has smooth white to pale grey over nearly all of the trunk, sometimes with a partially thin, rough and irregularly flaky-tessellated at the base of the trunk. Flowering occurs from September to October and the flower are white.

Taxonomy
The species was first formally described in 1843 by the botanist Johannes Conrad Schauer as Eucalyptus clavigera from an unpublished description by Allan Cunningham. Schauer's description was published in Wilhelm Gerhard Walpers book Repertorium Botanices Systematicae. It was reclassified as Corymbia watsoniana in 1995 by Kenneth Hill and Lawrence Alexander Sidney Johnson in the journal Telopea.

Distribution and habitat
Corymbia clavigera is only known with certainty from the type location in coastal areas of the Kimberley region of Western Australia.  It is also likely to be growing on nearby off-shore islands and in areas of the Carson River volcanics between Port Warrender and the Mitchell Plateau.

Conservation status
This eucalypt is classified as "not threatened" by the Western Australian Government Department of Parks and Wildlife.

See also
List of Corymbia species

References

clavigera
Myrtales of Australia
Flora of Western Australia
Plants described in 1843